Todzie is a stream located in Ghana and forms partly the Border to south west Togo. The estimated terrain elevation above sea level is 5 metres. Variant forms of spelling for Todzie or in other languages: Todjé, Todje, Toje, Todji, Toji, Todjie, Todschië or Todie.

References

Rivers of Ghana
Rivers of Togo